Ryggehøi is a mountain in Lom Municipality in Innlandet county, Norway. The mountain is surrounded by several other notable mountains including Horrungen, Leirungshøi, and Finndalshorungen to the southwest, Skardtind to the north, Rundkollan and Storbrettingskollen to the east, and Gjerdinghøi and Lauvknubben to the southeast.

See also
List of mountains of Norway

References

Lom, Norway
Mountains of Innlandet